Ambrož pod Krvavcem is a high-elevation village in the Municipality of Cerklje na Gorenjskem in the Upper Carniola region of Slovenia.

Geography

Ambrož pod Krvavcem is a scattered settlement on the southern slope of Mount Krvavec. Farms are located on terraces at lower elevations, extending west to Stiška Vas and east to Sveti Lenart.

Name
Ambrož pod Krvavcem was attested in historical sources as S. Ambrosen perg in 1496 and St. Ambrosi in 1499. The name of the settlement was changed from Sveti Ambrož (literally, 'Saint Ambrose') to Ambrož pod Krvavcem (literally, 'Ambrose below Mount Krvavec') in 1955. The name was changed on the basis of the 1948 Law on Names of Settlements and Designations of Squares, Streets, and Buildings as part of efforts by Slovenia's postwar communist government to remove religious elements from toponyms. In the past the German name was Sankt Ambrosi.

Church

The local church is dedicated to Saint Ambrose, thus also the village's name. The church is said to have been damaged in 1471 during an Ottoman raid, when the Cerklje Basin was also burned by Ottoman forces. According to oral tradition, Ottoman horseshoes were later widely found in the area.

References

External links

Ambrož pod Krvavcem on Geopedia

Populated places in the Municipality of Cerklje na Gorenjskem